Georgina McGuinness (née Allan, formerly Thomas) is a newsreader who was the anchor of Nine News Adelaide's weekend 6pm news bulletin from 1989 to 2011.

Early life
An Adelaide native, born 29 August 1966, she studied at Seymour College and at the Magill campus of the South Australian College of Advanced Education (now a part of the University of South Australia).

Career
She graduated in 1987 and joined Nine News as a reporter. Just a year later she was appointed weekend news anchor, which job she continued to 2011, along with filing special reports. During this time, her bulletins consistently rated higher than the rival Seven News Adelaide in its timeslot. In 2002, she was the anchor of the short lived local version of A Current Affair.

Until 2007, McGuinness was also the co-anchor of the annual Adelaide Christmas Pageant telecast which airs in early November each year.

In October 2011, it was announced that McGuinness would not have her contract renewed with the Nine Network. In early 2012, McGuinness joined the staff of South Australian Opposition Leader Isobel Redmond as a speechwriter.

Personal life
After a number of years presenting as both Georgina Allan, and later Georgina Thomas, she married former Adelaide Crows captain Tony McGuinness in 1999. She is the mother of four children,with 3 children from a previous marriage. 

One of her pastimes is marathon running. She has run marathons in Amsterdam, Berlin and London.

References

External links
 NineMSN
 Onya Soapbox talent bio

1966 births
Nine News presenters
Living people
University of South Australia alumni
Journalists from South Australia